In statistics, Hájek projection of a random variable  on a set of independent random vectors  is a particular measurable function of  that, loosely speaking, captures the variation of  in an optimal way. It is named after the Czech statistician Jaroslav Hájek .

Definition 
Given a random variable  and a set of independent random vectors , the Hájek projection  of  onto  is given by

Properties 

 Hájek projection  is an projection of  onto a linear subspace of all random variables of the form , where  are arbitrary measurable functions such that  for all 
  and hence 
 Under some conditions, asymptotic distributions of the sequence of statistics  and the sequence of its Hájek projections  coincide, namely, if , then  converges to zero in probability.

References 

Asymptotic analysis
Multivariate statistics
Probability theory